China General Aviation (Corporation - CGAC) was an airline based in Taiyuan Wusu International Airport, China. It operated a fleet of 8 Yakovlev Yak-42D and later 3 Boeing 737-300 aircraft. It was acquired by China Eastern Airlines in 1997.

Code data
IATA Code: GP
ICAO Code: CTH
Callsign: TONGHANG

Fleet

Yakolev Yak-42D: B-2751, B-2752, B-2753, B-2754, B-2755, B-2756, B-2757, B-2758
Boeing 737-300: B-2977, B-2978, B-2979
Its 3 Boeing 737-300 aircraft were transferred to China Eastern Airlines.

Accidents and incidents
On July 31, 1992, China General Aviation Flight 7552 crashed into a pond past the runway after takeoff from Nanjing Dajiaochang Airport. 8 of the 10 crew members and 100 of the 116 passengers died.

References

External links
China General Aviation Former Fleet Detail

 
Defunct airlines of China
Airlines disestablished in 1997